Vanadium(IV) oxide or vanadium dioxide is an inorganic compound with the formula VO2. It is a dark blue solid. Vanadium(IV) dioxide is amphoteric, dissolving in non-oxidising acids to give the blue vanadyl ion, [VO]2+ and in alkali to give the brown [V4O9]2− ion, or at high pH [VO4]4−. VO2 has a phase transition very close to room temperature (~). Electrical resistivity, opacity, etc, can change up several orders. Owing to these properties, it has been used in surface coating, sensors, and imaging. Potential applications include use in memory devices, phase-change switches, passive radiative cooling applications, such as smart windows and roofs, that cool or warm depending on temperature, aerospace communication systems and neuromorphic computing.

Properties

Structure 

At temperatures below Tc = ,  has a monoclinic (space group P21/c) crystal structure. Above Tc, the structure is tetragonal, like rutile . In the monoclinic phase, the V4+ ions form pairs along the c axis, leading to alternate short and long V-V distances of 2.65 Å and 3.12 Å. In comparison, in the rutile phase the V4+ ions are separated by a fixed distance of 2.96 Å. As a result, the number of V4+ ions in the crystallographic unit cell doubles from the rutile to the monoclinic phase.

The equilibrium morphology of rutile  particles is acicular, laterally confined by (110) surfaces, which are the most stable termination planes. The surface tends to be oxidized with respect to the stoichiometric composition, with the oxygen adsorbed on the (110) surface forming vanadyl species. The presence of V5+ ions at the surface of  films has been confirmed by X-ray photoelectron spectroscopy.

Memory effect 
In 2022, a to date unique and unknown feature of the material was reported – it can "remember" previous external stimuli (via structural rather than electronic states), with potential for e.g. data storage and processing, potentially including in neuromorphic computing.

Electronic 
At the rutile to monoclinic transition temperature,  also exhibits a metal to semiconductor transition in its electronic structure: the rutile phase is metallic while the monoclinic phase is semiconducting. The optical band gap of VO2 in the low-temperature monoclinic phase is about 0.7 eV.

Thermal 
Metallic VO2 contradicts the Wiedemann–Franz law that holds that the ratio of the electronic contribution of the thermal conductivity (κ) to the electrical conductivity (σ) of a metal is proportional to the temperature. The thermal conductivity that could be attributed to electron movement was 10% of the amount predicted by the Wiedemann–Franz law. The reason for this appears to be the fluidic way that the electrons move through the material, reducing the typical random electron motion. Thermal conductivity ~ 0.2 W/m⋅K, electrical conductivity ~ 8.0 ×10^5 S/m.

Potential applications include converting waste heat from engines and appliances into electricity, and windows or window coverings that keep buildings cool. Thermal conductivity varied when VO2 was mixed with other materials. At a low temperature it could act as an insulator, while conducting heat at a higher temperature.

Synthesis and structure

Following the method described by Berzelius,  is prepared by comproportionation of vanadium(III) oxide and vanadium(V) oxide:
   +     →    4 
At room temperature VO2 has a distorted rutile structure with shorter distances between pairs of V atoms indicating metal-metal bonding. Above , the structure changes to an undistorted rutile structure and the metal-metal bonds are broken causing an increase in electrical conductivity and magnetic susceptibility as the bonding electrons are "released". The origin of this insulator to metal transition remains controversial and is of interest both for condensed matter physics and practical applications, such as electrical switches, tunable electrical filters, power limiters, nano-oscillators, memristors, field-effect transistors and metamaterials.

Infrared reflectance

 expresses temperature-dependent reflective properties. At room temperature,  is almost transparent to infrared light. As its temperature rises it gradually changes to reflective. At intermediate temperatures it behaves as a highly absorbing dielectric.

A thin film of vanadium oxide on a highly reflecting substrate (for specific infrared wavelengths) such as sapphire is either absorbing or reflecting, dependent on temperature. Its emissivity varies considerably with temperature. When the vanadium oxide transitions with increased temperature, the structure undergoes a sudden decrease in emissivity – looking colder to infrared cameras than it really is.

Varying the substrate materials (e.g., to indium tin oxide), as well as modifying the vanadium oxide coating using doping, straining, or other processes, alters the wavelengths and temperature ranges at which the thermal effects are observed.

Nanoscale structures that appear naturally in the materials' transition region can suppress thermal radiation as the temperature rises. Doping the coating with tungsten lowers the effect's thermal range to room temperature.

Uses

Infrared radiation management
Undoped and tungsten-doped vanadium dioxide films can act as "spectrally-selective" coatings to block infrared transmission and reduce the loss of building interior heat through windows. The coating has a slight yellow-green color.

Other potential applications of its thermal properties include passive camouflage, thermal beacons, communication, or to deliberately speed up or slow down cooling. These applications could be useful for a variety of structures from homes to satellites.

Vanadium dioxide can act as extremely fast optical modulators, infrared modulators for missile guidance systems, cameras, data storage, and other applications.

Passive radiative cooling 
Vanadium dioxide is essential to achieving temperature-based 'switchable' cooling and heating effects for passive daytime radiative cooling surfaces without additional energy input. Temperature-based switching can be essential to mitigate potential "overcooling" effects of radiative cooling devices in urban environments, especially those with hot summers and cool winters, making it possible for radiative coolers to also function as passive heating devices when necessary.

Phase change computing and memory
The insulator-metal phase transition in VO2 can be manipulated at the nanoscale using a biased conducting atomic force microscope tip, suggesting applications in computing and information storage.

See also
Vanadium redox battery

References

Bibliography

External links

Vanadium(IV) compounds
Transition metal oxides